Muhammad Ilhamsyah (born 2 July 1999), simply known as Ilhamsyah, is an Indonesian professional footballer who plays as a central midfielder for Liga 2 club Bekasi City, on loan from Borneo.

Club career

Borneo
Ilhamsyah signed with Borneo to play in the Indonesian Liga 1 for the 2019 season. He made his league debut on 5 November 2019 in a match against Badak Lampung at the Segiri Stadium, Samarinda.

RANS Cilegon (loan)
In 2021, Ilhamsyah signed a contract with Indonesian Liga 2 club RANS Cilegon. He made his league debut on 2 November 2021 in a match against Dewa United at the Gelora Bung Karno Madya Stadium, Jakarta.

Career statistics

Club

Notes

References

External links
 Ilhamsyah at Soccerway
 Ilhamsyah at Liga Indonesia

1999 births
Living people
Indonesian footballers
Liga 1 (Indonesia) players
Liga 2 (Indonesia) players
Borneo F.C. players
RANS Nusantara F.C. players
Association football midfielders
People from Balikpapan
Sportspeople from East Kalimantan